Deon Bush (born August 14, 1993) is an American football safety for the Kansas City Chiefs of the National Football League (NFL). He played college football at Miami and was drafted by the Chicago Bears in the fourth round of the 2016 NFL Draft.

Professional career

Chicago Bears
Bush was selected in the fourth round (124th overall) by the Chicago Bears in the 2016 NFL Draft. He signed a four-year contract worth $2.8 million with a $526,216 signing bonus. Bush made his NFL debut on September 25 against the Dallas Cowboys. In his third career game, he logged his first career tackle against the Green Bay Packers. He made his first career start on November 20, logging seven tackles. On December 18, Bush recorded his first pass breakup against the Green Bay Packers. Bush finished his rookie season with six starts in eleven games, 22 tackles and a pass breakup.

Bush had six tackles in 13 games in 2017.

Bush recorded his first NFL sack on November 22, 2018 when he sacked Matthew Stafford in the second quarter of the Bears' 23–16 victory over the Detroit Lions. On December 23, Bush started at free safety against the San Francisco 49ers in place of an injured Eddie Jackson; he recorded two tackles in the 14–9 Chicago victory.

Bush re-signed with the Bears on March 26, 2020. In Week 2 of the 2020 season against the New York Giants, Bush recorded his first career interception off a pass thrown by Daniel Jones during the 17–13 win. Bush was placed on the reserve/COVID-19 list by the team on November 8, 2020, and was activated four days later.

On March 17, 2021, Bush re-signed with the Bears. He suffered a quad injury in Week 6 and was placed on injured reserve on October 19, 2021. He was activated on November 20.

Kansas City Chiefs
Bush signed with the Kansas City Chiefs on March 28, 2022. Bush won Super Bowl LVII when the Chiefs defeated the Philadelphia Eagles.

References

External links
 Chicago Bears bio
 Miami Hurricanes bio
 

1993 births
Living people
Players of American football from Miami
Christopher Columbus High School (Miami-Dade County, Florida) alumni
American football safeties
Miami Hurricanes football players
Chicago Bears players
Kansas City Chiefs players